Live in Chicago is an album of live recordings by Little Walter and Otis Rush, purportedly recorded at the Chicago Blues Festival in 1967.  According to the All Music Guide to the Blues, "These live performances have been circulating around bootleg channels under a plethora of titles for decades."  Some of these titles include:

 At the Chicago Blues Festival
 Blues Masters
 Little Walter & Otis Rush
 Live at the Chicago Blues Festival
 Live in the Windy City
 Windy City Blues

Track listing
Tracks 1-4 feature Otis Rush and tracks 5-8 feature Little Walter (composer credit, when known, follows the track name.)

 "It's So Hard for Me to Believe You Baby"
 "May Be the Last Time" (James Brown)
 "I Got You (I Feel Good)" (James Brown)
 "Otis' Blue" (Otis Rush)
 "Goin' Down Slow" (James Oden)
 "Walter's Blues" (Walter Jacobs)
 "You're So Fine" (Jacobs)
 "Watermelon Man" (Herbie Hancock)

References

Little Walter albums
Otis Rush albums